Tenneville is a municipality of Wallonia located in the province of Luxembourg, Belgium. 

On 1 January 2018 the municipality, which covers 91.81 km², had 2,842 inhabitants, giving a population density of 31 inhabitants per km².

The municipality consists of the following districts: Champlon, Erneuville, and Tenneville. Other population centers include Baconfoy, Beaulieu, Belle-Vue, Berguème, Cens, Grainchamps, Journal, Laneuville-au-Bois, Mochamps, Ortheuville, Prelle, Ramont, Tresfontaines, Wembay, and Wyompont.

References

External links
 
 Official website 

 
Municipalities of Luxembourg (Belgium)